The Battle of Chaegunghyon or The Battle Of Happy Valley was a conflict in the Korean War fought in Happy Valley by China and North Korea against South Korea and the UN. The Battle of Chaegunghyon took place on the night of the 3–4 January 1951 and held back the advancing Chinese and North Korean forces helping to facilitate the evacuation of Seoul.

Background 
In December 1950, having been swept from North Korea by a shock Chinese offensive, defeated UN forces stood at bay in the South. On New Year’s Day, 1951, the Chinese stormed over the border and South Korean forces disintegrated. Britain’s crack 29th Infantry Brigade was thrust into the line near Koyang, 12 miles northwest of Seoul.

Amid blizzards, the brigade dug a shaky line over the hills. On the left flank, reinforced by ten 8th Hussars Cromwell tanks (Cooper Force), stood the RUR. By Jan 3 there was nothing between them and the onrushing Chinese.

Before dawn that day indistinct figures appeared in front of the RUR trenches. A patrol descended into the valley and men on the hills heard a staccato burst . . . then silence. The patrol had blundered into the main assault force and from nowhere the Chinese broke cover and charged. Two RUR platoons were overrun.

Galway native and acting battalion commander Major Tony Blake orchestrated the firepower of tanks, artillery and US jets in an immediate riposte. Second Lieutenant Mervyn McCord was part of a patrol that counter-attacked their old position after a napalm strike.

The men took the ridge without casualties and stood around congratulating themselves until a major arrived, roaring: “This is not a funfair!” Meanwhile, ‘B’ Company prepared to retake the other lost peak.

“We lined them up,” said Captain Robin Charley, a Belfast man who had volunteered for Korea. “That attack went in exactly by the book — just like at the School of Infantry!”

The Ulstermen were ecstatic at having beaten off the previously undefeated Chinese. To their right, the Royal Northumberland Fusiliers had also fought a bloody, but successful battle. Elsewhere, though, the front had buckled. UN forces were falling back. Seoul was to be abandoned.

The RUR would be the last UN unit to withdraw, the US division on its left had already departed.

Citations

References

Battles of the Korean War